In enzymology, a 1,3-propanediol dehydrogenase is an enzyme that catalyzes the chemical reaction

propane-1,3-diol + NAD+  3-hydroxypropanal + NADH + H+

Thus, the two substrates of this enzyme are propane-1,3-diol and NAD+, whereas its 3 products are 3-hydroxypropanal, NADH, and H+.

This enzyme belongs to the family of oxidoreductases, specifically those acting on the CH-OH group of donor with NAD+ or NADP+ as acceptor. The systematic name of this enzyme class is propane-1,3-diol:NAD+ 1-oxidoreductase. Other names in common use include 3-hydroxypropionaldehyde reductase, 1,3-PD:NAD+ oxidoreductase, 1,3-propanediol:NAD+ oxidoreductase, and 1,3-propanediol dehydrogenase. This enzyme participates in ether lipid metabolism as a step in glycerolipid biosynthesis.

References

 
 

EC 1.1.1
NADH-dependent enzymes
Enzymes of known structure